Club Sportiv Dante Botoșani, commonly known as Dante Botoșani, or simply as Dante, is a Romanian football club based in Botoșani, Botoșani County. The club was founded in 2002 and played only in amateur leagues until 2020, when it promoted to Liga III.

History
Dante Botoșani was established in 2002 and played only in the amateur leagues until 2020, when it promoted to Liga III, after winning Liga IV Botoșani and the promotion play-off group against Sporting Vaslui and Viitorul Curița. In the first season ever spent at the level of the third tier, Dante was ranked 6th out of 10.

Dante is owned by Victor Mihalachi, a businessman who also held FCM Dorohoi, between 2010 and 2015. The team is considered as the second important club in the Botoșani County, after top-flight side FC Botoșani.

Ground
The second club of Botoșani County, played its home matches on the Municipal Stadium, in Dorohoi, with a capacity of 2,000 seats. Some of their home matches are played on Baza Sportivă Bucecea, based in Bucecea, Botoșani County, a football ground opened in 2022, with a capacity of 500 seats and an artificial turf.

Honours
Liga III
Winners (1):  2021–22

Liga IV – Botoșani County
Winners (1): 2019–20
Runners-up (1): 2012–13

Liga V – Botoșani County
Winners (1): 2018–19
Runners-up (1): 2011–12

Players

First team squad

Out on loan

Club officials

Board of directors

Current technical staff

League history

References

External links
CS Dante Botoșani at frf-ajf.ro

Association football clubs established in 2002
Football clubs in Botoșani County
Liga III clubs
Liga IV clubs
2002 establishments in Romania